The 2014–15 FC Rostov season was the sixth successive season that the club will play in the Russian Premier League, the highest tier of association football in Russia. Rostov will also take part in the Russian Cup and the Europa League, their first European campaign since 2000, entering at the Play-off round.

On 25 September 2014, Miodrag Božović resigned as the club's manager, with Igor Gamula appointed as his replacement. Following Rostov's 1-0 win over FC Ural, Gamula became involved in a racism row following question to the possibility of Rostov signing Benoit Angbwa, saying that six "dark-skinned players" was sufficient for the team. On 12 November Gamula was handed a 5-Game ban following his remarks.

On 18 December, Gamula was moved to Youth Team 21 manager, with Kurban Berdyev being appointed as the new manager of the first team.

Squad

 (captain)

Out on loan

Reserve squad

Transfers

Summer

In:

Out:

Winter

In:

Out:

Friendlies

Competitions

Russian Super Cup

Russian Premier League

Results by round

Matches

League table

Relegation play-offs

Russian Cup

UEFA Europa League

Qualifying phase

Squad statistics

Appearances and goals

|-
|colspan="14"|Players away from the club on loan:

|-
|colspan="14"|Players who appeared for Rostov no longer at the club:

|}

Goal Scorers

Disciplinary record

Notes
 MSK time changed from UTC+4 to UTC+3 permanently on 26 October 2014.

References

FC Rostov seasons
Rostov
Rostov